Kate Roberts is a British human rights advocate and humanitarian. She works on a global scale to develop programs and services which target malaria, child survival, HIV/AIDS, gender equality, reproductive health, and non-communicable disease. She is best known as the founder of YouthAIDS and Five & Alive, subsidiaries of Population Services International (PSI), where she serves as vice president of corporate marketing and communications.

Early career
Roberts is originally from Southport, Merseyside in the United Kingdom, where she graduated from Southport College with a City and Guilds in Hotel and Catering Management. She started her career with the hotel group, Relais et Chateau. She speaks five languages including Russian, Dutch, and Romanian. She is also an accomplished contemporary artist and interior designer.

In the early 1990s, Roberts moved to Moscow, where she worked on launching the Russian version of Cosmopolitan Magazine, before moving into work in advertising and marketing with Saatchi & Saatchi. Her work then took her to Romania where she created this country's first HIV/AIDS prevention marketing campaign that, Roberts said, "increased condom use by 100 percent in the first year".  On holiday in South Africa she became aware of the scale of mortality being caused by the disease AIDS in the country and realised that the work and strategies she had put in place in her Romanian campaign could be applied to the rest of the world. This led her to create the YouthAIDS campaign in 2001.

Programming development 
YouthAIDS
Kate Roberts founded YouthAIDS in 2001 as an educational and prevention campaign for the charity Population Services International (PSI). YouthAIDS is based in Washington, DC, while being active in around 70 countries.

Five & Alive
After the success of YouthAIDS Roberts started another PSI campaign, Five & Alive, in order to raise money for and awareness of PSI projects to tackle preventable disease in children under five years old.

References

External links 
 Kate Roberts on YoungGlobalLeaders.org
 Kate Roberts on weforum.org

Living people
British advertising executives
HIV/AIDS activists
Year of birth missing (living people)
People from Southport